In taxonomy, Methanosphaera is a genus of microbes within the family Methanobacteriaceae. It was distinguished from other genera within Methanobacteriaceae in 1985 on the basis of the oligonucleotide sequence of its 16S RNA. Like other archaea within Methanobacteriaceae, those of Methanosphaera are methanogens, but while most use formate to reduce carbon dioxide, those of Methanosphaera use hydrogen to reduce methanol to methane.

See also
 List of Archaea genera

References

Further reading

Scientific journals

Scientific books

Scientific databases

External links

Archaea genera
Euryarchaeota